John Ross (1842–1915), was a Scottish Protestant missionary to Northeast China who established Dongguan Church in Shenyang.  He is also known for translating the first Korean Bible and being the first to introduce spacing to Korean punctuation.

Life

John Ross was born at Rarichie in Easter Ross where Gaelic was his native language. He received his education at Fearn School, Glasgow University and Theological Hall, Edinburgh. In 1872 he was sent by the Scottish United Presbyterian Mission to Northeast China, known at that time as Manchuria. This church was called Dongguan Church (East Gate Church) because it was built just outside East Gate, as Christian churches were not allowed within the city wall. It was rebuilt after the Boxer Rebellion, and is now still used as a Protestant church. He also started a mission in Fushun.

While in China, John Ross met traders from Korea one day, and decided to make a Korean translation of the New Testament, which was completed in 1887 and brought to Korea. This was the first Korean version In 1892 he was visited from Korea by James Scarth Gale.

Ross returned to Scotland in 1910, but continued to help the Scotland-China Society. He died in Edinburgh and is buried there mid-way along the east side of the main north-south path in Newington Cemetery. There is a plaque commemorating John Ross on the sea front at Balintore in Easter Ross.

Family

He was married to Isabella Strapp McFadyen (d.1930) who travelled with him in China.

Recognition

In 1877, John Gilbert Baker named Iris rossii in his honour. Ray Desmond (Editor).

Works 
Corean primer: being lessons in Corean on all ordinary subjects, transliterated on the principles of the "Mandarin primer", by the same author (1877)
The Manchus, or The reigning dynasty of China: their rise and progress (1891)
 History of Corea, Ancient and Modern; with Description of Manners and Customs, Language and Geography (1891)

See also

 Christianity in China
 Christianity in Korea
 Korean Bible
 Scottish United Presbyterian Mission
 Seo Sang-ryun

References

External links
 Father of the Korean Church
 Ross and Bible women in the early Protestant mission of northern Korea and Eastern China

Scottish Presbyterian missionaries
Presbyterian missionaries in China
Presbyterian missionaries in Korea
1842 births
1915 deaths
Translators of the Bible into Korean
19th-century translators
British expatriates in China
British expatriates in Korea
Missionary linguists